José Escribens (born 9 September 1911) was a Peruvian modern pentathlete. He competed at the 1936 Summer Olympics.

References

External links
 

1911 births
Year of death missing
Peruvian male modern pentathletes
Olympic modern pentathletes of Peru
Modern pentathletes at the 1936 Summer Olympics